The 2005 Suwon Samsung Bluewings season was Suwon Samsung Bluewings's tenth season in the K-League in Republic of Korea. Suwon Samsung Bluewings is competing in K-League, League Cup, Korean Super Cup, Korean FA Cup, A3 Champions Cup and AFC Champions League.

Squad

Backroom Staff

Coaching Staff
Head coach:  Cha Bum-Kun
Assistant coach:  Marco Pezzaiuoli 
Coach:  Lee Lim-Saeng
Reserve Team Coach:  Choi Man-Hee
GK Coach:  Cho Byung-Deuk
Physical trainer:  Lee Chang-Yeop

Scout
 Kim Soon-Ki
 Jung Kyu-Poong

Executive Office
Club Chairman:  Lee Yoon-Woo 
Managing Director:  Ahn Ki-Hyun

Honours

Club
Korean Super Cup Winners
K-League Cup Winners
A3 Champions Cup Winners

Individual
K-League Best XI:  Cho Won-Hee

References

External links
 Suwon Bluewings Official website

Suwon Samsung Bluewings seasons
Suwon Samsung Bluewings